The 2016 Tandridge District Council election took place on 5 May 2016 to elect members of Tandridge District Council in England. This was on the same day as other local elections.

Election result
The Conservatives lost three seats but remain in control of the council. The Leader of the Council, Gordon Keymer CBE lost his seat to Oxted & Limpsfield Residents' Group candidate Jackie Wren with a swing of 49.3%. The Liberal Democrats picked up the other two gains.

Ward results

An asterisk * indicates an incumbent seeking re-election.

By-elections between 2016 and 2018

Warlingham West
A by-election was held in Warlingham West ward on 21 July 2016 following the death of Conservative Cllr Glynis Whittle.

Keith Prew held the seat for the Conservatives.

Limpsfield
A by-election was held in Limpsfield ward on 13 October 2016 following the resignation of Conservative Cllr John Pannett.

Phil Davies gained the seat for the Oxted and Limpsfield Residents Group.

Valley
A by-election was held in Valley ward on 24 November 2016 following the resignation of Liberal Democrats Cllr Jill Caudle who was moving away from the area to live nearer family.

Dorinda Cooper held the seat for the Liberal Democrats.

Westway
A by-election was held in Westway ward on 30 November 2017 following the resignation of Liberal Democrats Cllr Caroline Warner.

Helen Rujbally held the seat for the Liberal Democrats.

References

2016 English local elections
2016
2010s in Surrey